The Journal de la Société des Américanistes (Journal of the Society of Americanists) is an academic journal covering the cultural anthropology of the Americas.

External links 
 
 Société des Américanistes

Anthropology journals
American studies journals
Publications established in 1885
Biannual journals
Multilingual journals
1885 establishments in France